Brian Reece (24 July 1913 – 12 April 1962) was an English actor.

Biography
Born in Wallasey, Cheshire, he starred as the eponymous policeman in the BBC radio series The Adventures of PC 49 (1947–1953). His films include Orders Are Orders (1954), A Case for PC 49 (1951), Geordie (1955) and Carry On Admiral (1957). On stage, he appeared in Bless The Bride (1947), Bet Your Life (1952) with Julie Wilson and Arthur Askey. He appeared twice as a castaway on the BBC Radio programme Desert Island Discs, first on 24 July 1953. and again on 17 April 1961.

In 1955 he appeared at Aldwych Theatre in the farce Man Alive! by John Dighton.

Reece died in London, aged 48.

Selected filmography
 A Case for PC 49'' (1951)

References

External links 

 

1913 births
1962 deaths
BBC people